Spinks is a surname, and may refer to:

 Alfred Spinks (1917–1982), British chemist
 Brett Spinks (b. 1973), Australian athlete in football
 Charlton Spinks (1877–1959), British Army officer
 Cory Spinks (b. 1978), US athlete in boxing
 Darrell Spinks (b. 1973), US athlete in boxing
 David Rubio (1934–2000), British musical instrument maker (born David Joseph Spinks)
 Ford Spinks (1927–2016), American politician
 Fred Spinks (1902–1982), Bermudan athlete in cricket
 Gracie Spinks (died 2021), English lifeguard believed to have been murdered
 Jack Spinks (1930–1994), US athlete in football
 Joe Spinks (b. 1972), US athlete in baseball
 Johanna Spinks, British-American artist
 John Spinks (academic) (1908–1997), English-born Canadian university president
 John Spinks (musician) (1953–2014), English musician and songwriter
 Leon Spinks (1953–2021), US athlete in boxing
 Michael Spinks (b. 1956), US athlete in boxing
 Nicky Spinks (b. c. 1968), English athlete in distance running
 Scipio Spinks (b. 1947), US athlete in baseball
 Stan Spinks (1912–2003), Australian athlete in football
 Terence Spinks (b. 1960), British athlete in boxing
 Tommy Spinks (1948-2007), US athlete in football
 Tommy Spinks (rugby union) (b. 1994), Scottish athlete in rugby
 William A. Spinks (1865–1933), US billiards player
 William H. Spinks (1873–1950), Canadian political figure

See also
 Great Sphinx of Giza
 Spink (disambiguation)